Kevin Dominique Gameiro (born 9 May 1987) is a French professional footballer who plays as a striker for Ligue 1 club Strasbourg. He is a strong striker who is known for his clinical finishing, which compensates for his relatively light frame.

Gameiro began his football career playing for clubs along the Oise such as Marly-la-Ville and US Chantilly. In 2004, he moved to the Alsace region to join professional club Strasbourg. He made his professional debut in the 2004–05 season and appeared in the UEFA Cup with Strasbourg. After three seasons with the club, in August 2008, Gameiro signed a four-year deal with FC Lorient. With Lorient, he finished his first two seasons with the club as top scorer. In the 2009–10 season, Gameiro contributed to the team that achieved a 7th-place finish; the club's highest finish in Ligue 1 ever.

Gameiro is a former France youth international, having earned caps at under-18, under-20, and under-21 level. At under-20 level, he played on the team that won the 2007 edition of the Toulon Tournament. Gameiro scored a hat trick in the final and finished the competition as its top scorer. In August 2010, he was called up to the senior team for the first time and made his senior international debut on 3 September 2010 in a match against Belarus.

Early career
His family came from Portugal. He began his football career playing for ES Marly-la-Ville not far from his hometown at the age of six. Prior to turning 13, he opted to remain in the region of Picardie and joined US Chantilly. While excelling at US Chantilly, Gameiro was spotted by former Strasbourg player and scout Jacky Duguépéroux who recommended the player join his former club. In 2004, Gameiro completed his move to the Alsatian club joining as a youth player.

Club career

Strasbourg
Upon arrival, Gameiro was inserted onto the club's reserve team in the Championnat de France Amateur, the fourth level of French football. He spent the entire 2004–05 season playing with the team. Gameiro featured in 20 matches and scored four goals. In 2005, with Duguépéroux now managing the team, Gameiro made his professional debut on 10 September 2005 in a match against Paris Saint-Germain appearing as a substitute in the 59th minute of a 1–0, Ligue 1 defeat. On 14 December, Gameiro made his European debut in a UEFA Cup match against Serbian club Red Star Belgrade. With Strasbourg trailing 2–0 late in the match, Gameiro scored his first professional goal for the club in the 79th minute. In the final minutes of play, he scored the equalizing goal to draw the match at 2–2. The stalemate ensured Strasbourg won the group and the team later advanced to the Round of 16 where they suffered elimination losing 4–2 on aggregate to Swiss club FC Basel. A month later, Gameiro converted his third goal of the season in the team's 4–0 victory over Nancy in the Coupe de France. In league play, Gameiro scored his first career league goal on 4 February 2006 in a 2–1 loss to Lens. Three weeks later, his season was cut short after rupturing ligaments in one of his knees following a tackle from Troyes midfielder Blaise Kouassi. The injury required six months of rehabilitation, which resulted in Gameiro missing the Coupe Gambardella competition, which the Strasbourg under-19 team won, defeating Lyon 3–1 in the final at the Stade de France. Overall, Gameiro's season was a success, however, due to the club focusing more on Europe, the team suffered relegation to Ligue 2 for the 2006–07 season.

Due to undergoing rehabilitation on his knee, Gameiro made his debut with Strasbourg in Ligue 2 late in the season on 19 September 2006 in the club's 2–0 loss to Auxerre in the Coupe de la Ligue. He scored his first goal two months later in a 2–0 victory over Istres. Through the rest of the season, Gameiro alternated between the bench and the starting eleven. He only scored two goals, against Gueugnon and Istres, again, for the rest of the season as Strasbourg achieved promotion back to Ligue 1 courtesy of the club's 3rd-place finish. In his first full season as a professional, Gameiro scored six total goals in 36 total appearances. He scored in back-to-back matches during the early portion of the season against Auxerre and Toulouse, but went cold mid-season scoring only two goals. He scored his final two goals for the club in the final two matches of the season against Caen and Marseille. Strasbourg lost both matches., causing Strasbourg to again suffer relegation to Ligue 2.

Lorient

Despite strong interest from Marseille, on 17 June 2008, Gameiro agreed to a four-year deal with Brittany-based outfit Lorient. The club paid Strasbourg a transfer fee of €3 million for his services. Gameiro was given the number 9 shirt and installed as the club's head striker. He made his club debut on 9 August 2008 playing the entire match in a 1–0 victory over Le Mans. Two weeks later, he scored his first goal for the club in a 3–1 defeat to Valenciennes. On 25 October, he contributed to Lorient's 3–0 rout of Brittany rivals Nantes. The following month, Gameiro scored goals in back-to-back matches on two occasions. Lorient went undefeated in the four matches. In the Coupe de France, Lorient reached the Round of 16. Gameiro scored goals against Alençon and Tours in the Round of 64 and Round of 32, respectively. Gameiro continued his consistency during the spring portion of the season scoring goals against Sochaux, Grenoble, Marseille, and Nancy. Gameiro scored a double against the latter club. He finished the season with 39 total appearances and 13 goals. Lorient finished the season in 10th, tied for the club's highest finish ever in the first division.

Gameiro continued his rise in French football in the 2009–10 Ligue 1 season. He scored on his season debut on 8 August 2009 in a 2–1 win over Lille and converted another goal the following week against Montpellier in a 2–2 draw. A month later, he scored in back-to-back matches against Nancy and Grenoble as Lorient won both matches. Two weeks later, he scored in Lorient's 4–1 victory over Nice and, on 7 November, scored a double in the club's 5–0 thrashing of Boulogne. On 28 October, Gameiro scored the equalizing goal in Lorient's 2–2 stalemate with Grenoble converting the goal in injury time. The draw rose Lorient to 5th in the standings, the club's highest position that late in the season ever. On 27 January 2010, Gameiro scored the only goal in Lorient's upset victory over Lyon in the Coupe de la Ligue. Two weeks later, he scored in Lorient's 3–0 humiliation of Paris Saint-Germain at the Parc des Princes. The following week, Gameiro scored in a 1–1 draw with Toulouse. His consistent form prompted analysts to declare that Gameiro should be considered for the France national team, however, prior to the friendly against Spain on 3 March, Gameiro picked up an injury, which led to coach Raymond Domenech not considering him for the squad. Gameiro finished the 2009–10 campaign by scoring seven goals in the final nine league matches. He scored a brace against Saint-Étienne and converted opening goals in wins over Bordeaux, Grenoble, and Lille. In the six matches he scored in, Lorient won five and ultimately finished the campaign in 7th place; the club's highest finish in Ligue 1 ever.

In the 2010–11 season, Gameiro remained consistent. After missing the opening league match of the season, he returned to the team in mid-August. On 28 August, he scored the game-winning goal in a 2–0 victory over Lyon. In December, he played a part in all three goals in the team's 6–3 loss to Lille. Gameiro scored the team's opening goal in the 7th minute, netted his second just before half-time, and assisted on Lynel Kitambala's in the second half. In January 2011, Gameiro was the subject of intense transfer speculation. On 4 January, it was reported that the striker had reached an agreement on a contract with Spanish club Valencia. Despite the reported agreement, Lorient president Loïc Féry declared that while personal terms had been agreed, Valencia had never sent in a transfer fee offer for the player. Later in the month, French media reported that Lorient had accepted a bid from fellow Ligue 1 club Bordeaux. Bordeaux officials, however, revealed that Gameiro's preference was to play for Valencia. Ultimately, Gameiro remained with Lorient following the closure of the transfer window as Fery declared "our priority has always been to keep Kevin with us". Despite the speculation of a possible transfer, Gameiro remained potent on the field of play. Beginning in late January, he proceeded to go on a tear scoring seven goals in the team's four ensuing league matches. On 29 January, Gameiro scored both goals in a 2–0 win against Brest. In the next two weeks, he scored goals in a home win over Caen and an away defeat to Monaco. The impressive tally of goals culminated on 19 February 2011 when Gameiro scored a hat-trick in a 5–1 victory over Bordeaux.

Paris Saint-Germain

On 10 June 2011, media reports confirmed that Paris Saint-Germain had reached an agreement with Lorient for the transfer of Gameiro. The striker had previously favored a move to either Paris Saint-Germain or Valencia. Two days later, following a successful medical, the transfer was confirmed by Paris Saint-Germain. Gameiro agreed to a four-year contract and the transfer fee was priced at €11 million with future bonuses to be added later. Gameiro made his competitive debut for Paris Saint-Germain on 6 August 2011 in the team's opening 1–0 league defeat to Lorient. The following week, he scored his first goal for the club in its 1–1 draw with Rennes. On 18 August 2011, in Paris Saint-Germain's first leg UEFA Europa League playoff round tie against Luxembourger club Differdange, Gameiro scored the opening goal for the team in a 4–0 away win. Three days later, he again scored a goal in a 2–1 win over Valenciennes helping Paris Saint-Germain earn its first league win of the season. On 16 October, Gameiro achieved a hat trick in his side's 3–1 defeat of AC Ajaccio. Gameiro scored once more in 2011, against Sochaux, before his club thundered into the new year, remaining undefeated in 2012 as far as 31 March. Gameiro scored on 20 January, against Sablé-sur-Sarthe FC in Coupe de France play, 4 February, against Evian TG, and 11 March, against Dijon FCO. After this barrage of victories for his club, and assortment of goals for himself, Gameiro failed to score again in the 11/12 campaign.

Gameiro's first goal in the 12/13 campaign came 29 September 2012 against FC Sochaux, coupled with a second 22 minutes later. Gameiro scored thrice more in 2012, with goals coming against Stade de Reims, Evian TG, and Stade Brestois. Gameiro scored his first goal in 2013 against Toulouse FC, on 23 January, in Coupe de France play. Gameiro scored a notable assist when PSG squared off against Valencia CF in Champions League play, with Gameiro feeding Ezequiel Lavezzi for a 66th-minute goal, bequeathing PSG the aggregate victory. Gameiro's next goal came 29 March against Montpellier; 2013's final Gameiro goals were both scored against Gameiro's former outfit Lorient on 26 May. Given that Gameiro was transferred in the offseason, this occasion marked both his last scoring performance and last match for PSG.

Sevilla

On 25 July 2013, Gameiro signed a contract with  Sevilla for a fee of €10 million, agreeing to a five-year deal for the Ramón Sánchez Pizjuán club. In his first training session with the club on 30 July, Gameiro limped off the field with a groin injury, forcing the French striker out of the club's third-round Europa League clash with Mladost Podgorica.

Gameiro scored his first goal for the Spanish side in their first-leg Europa League play-off tie against Śląsk Wrocław, a 4–1 home win on 22 August. On 1 September, Gameiro achieved a brace against Málaga CF, including a header, but this failed to bring victory to his side as the match ended in a 2–2 draw. Following this, Gameiro scored on five occasions, including a 1 December contest against Granada CF, in which he also garnered a yellow card. On 16 March 2014, Gameiro netted a double as Sevilla thrashed Real Valladolid 4–1.

Gameiro scored a goal in either half against Espanyol on 6 April, helping his side record a 4–1 league victory. On 10 April 2014, Gameiro came off the bench and scored Sevilla's fourth and final goal in a Europa League quarter-final second-leg match, securing a 4–2 aggregate victory over Porto and a spot in the semi-finals of the 2013–14 Europa League. In the 2013–14 La Liga Seville derby against Real Betis three days later, Gameiro scored twice more to give Sevilla a 2–0 away victory. In the final of the 2013–14 Europa League against Portuguese side Benfica on 14 May 2014, Gameiro came off the bench in extra time and scored the game-winning penalty kick to secure a 4–2 shoot-out victory for Sevilla.

On 24 October 2015, Gameiro netted a hat-trick in a 2015–16 La Liga home match against Getafe CF, in which Sevilla won 5–0, his first La Liga hat-trick.

On 18 May 2016, just 17 seconds into the second half of the 2016 UEFA Europa League Final against Liverpool, Gameiro scored Sevilla's equalizing goal a metre from the goal line after receiving a low cross from Mariano Ferreira Filho who had burst into the penalty box from the right. That was his eighth 2015-16 UEFA Europa League goal. Sevilla won the match 3–1 to become the first team to win the UEFA Cup/Europa League three times in a row. It was their fifth UEFA Cup/Europa League title overall.

Atlético Madrid
On 30 July 2016, Atlético Madrid reached an agreement with Sevilla for the transfer of Gameiro on a four-year contract for a reported €32 million rising to €40 million with add-ons.

On 18 February 2017, Gameiro scored the fastest La Liga hat-trick in over 22 years, coming on a substitute in the 62nd minute in the match against Sporting de Gijón in a 4-1 victory.

Valencia
On 12 August 2018, Valencia CF reached an agreement with Atlético Madrid to sign Kevin Gameiro for €16 million.

Return to Strasbourg
On 18 July 2021, Strasbourg announced the signing of Gameiro on a two-year deal bringing him back to his childhood club.

International career
Gameiro represented France internationally at the under-18, under-20, and under-21 levels. He made his under-18 debut on 29 October 2004 in a friendly match against Russia. Gameiro made his lone other appearance with the under-18 team in the return match against Russia two days later. He established himself locally for his performance at the 2007 Toulon Tournament with the under-20 team. Gameiro scored five goals in four matches scoring only one goal in the group stage portion of the competition against Ivory Coast. In the semi-finals, Gameiro scored the only goal in the team's victory over Portugal. In the final against China, Gameiro netted a hat trick, which took only 33 minutes to complete in the team's 3–1 victory. Gameiro was named the Player of the Tournament for his performances. He made his under-21 debut on 26 March 2008 in a friendly against the Czech Republic. Gameiro, on his debut, netted the third goal in the team's 4–1 victory. Gameiro was called up for the under-21 team's 2009 UEFA European Under-21 Football Championship qualification play-offs tie against Germany, but did not feature in either leg. France lost the tie 2–1 on aggregate. The negative result ended Gameiro's under-21 career.

In August 2010, Gameiro was called up to the French senior team for the first time by new manager Laurent Blanc for the team's UEFA Euro 2012 qualification matches against Belarus and Bosnia and Herzegovina. He made his senior team debut in the match against Belarus appearing as a substitute in the second half. On 9 February 2011, Gameiro earned his second career cap in the team's 1–0 victory over Brazil. In his next appearance with the team against Ukraine on 6 June, he scored his first international goal netting the team's opener in a 4–1 win. On 7 October 2016, he scored a brace in the 2018 World Cup qualification match against Bulgaria, which France won 4–1.

Due to having Portuguese heritage through his paternal grandfather, Gameiro was eligible to represent Portugal at the senior international level. In 2009, then-manager Carlos Queiroz declared that Gameiro was "an interesting player" and that he "would love to talk to him" regarding representing Portugal. However, Gameiro downplayed the talk, stating that he "didn't really have any links to the country" and that he preferred to represent France.

Career statistics

Club

International

Scores and results list France's goal tally first, score column indicates score after each Gameiro goal.

Honours
Paris Saint-Germain
Ligue 1: 2012–13

Sevilla
UEFA Europa League: 2013–14, 2014–15, 2015–16

Atlético Madrid
 UEFA Europa League: 2017–18

Valencia
Copa del Rey: 2018–19

France U20
Toulon Tournament: 2007

Individual
UNFP Ligue 1 Team of the Year: 2010–11
UEFA Europa League Squad of the Season: 2015–16

References

External links

1987 births
Living people
People from Senlis
Sportspeople from Oise
French footballers
France youth international footballers
France under-21 international footballers
France international footballers
Association football forwards
RC Strasbourg Alsace players
FC Lorient players
Paris Saint-Germain F.C. players
Sevilla FC players
Atlético Madrid footballers
Valencia CF players
Ligue 1 players
Ligue 2 players
La Liga players
UEFA Europa League winning players
French expatriate footballers
Expatriate footballers in Spain
French expatriate sportspeople in Spain
French people of Portuguese descent
Footballers from Hauts-de-France